Sepidium is a genus of beetles of the family Tenebrionidae. It is the type genus of its tribe, Sepidiini.

Selected species
 Sepidium aliferum Erichson, 1841 
 Sepidium bidentatum Solier, 1843 
 Sepidium crassicaudatum Gestro, 1878
 Sepidium elongatum Mal, 1984 
 Sepidium lusitanicum Kaszab & Pinheiro, 1972 
 Sepidium magnum C.J.Gahan, 1900
 Sepidium siculum Solier, 1843 
 Sepidium tricuspidatum Fabricius, 1775

References

  Global Names Index
 Universal Biological Indexer

Pimeliinae
Tenebrionidae genera